Peter Ocko (sometimes credited as Pete Ocko) is an American television writer and producer. Ocko has had a very diverse 30-year career in television. He has written and produced for a number of popular television series throughout the 1990s, 2000s, and through to today including Pushing Daisies, The Office, The Leftovers, Elementary, and Black Sails and most recently Lodge 49. Ocko began his career as a staff writer on the HBO series Not Necessarily the News, followed by a string of single-camera comedies in the 1990s, writing for such shows as Parker Lewis Can't Lose and Dinosaurs. Crossing over to drama, he wrote for Dead Like Me and Boston Legal, and then created and ran the CBS medical drama 3 lbs starring Stanley Tucci. He now lives in California with his wife, Elizabeth, and 5 kids.

Career

Television writer 
Ocko's writing career began in 1989 when he was one of the writers on the 41st Primetime Emmy Awards and from there co-wrote five episodes of the series Dinosaurs with best friend Adam Barr. From the early nineties until the mid-2000s he wrote and produced for a number of well-received series, mostly comedy shows including Weird Science, Parker Lewis Can't Lose, Dead Like Me and Pushing Daisies, both of which under executive producer Bryan Fuller.

Television creator 
In the year 2000 he developed an animated series entitled Baby Blues based upon a comic strip. The series first aired on The WB and later on Adult Swim. Although the show was pulled from the schedule at the conclusion of its thirteen episode first season, a second season of thirteen episodes was produced but never aired. In 2006 he created a medical drama entitled 3 lbs, which aired on CBS but was cancelled soon after due to low ratings.

The Office 
Ocko began working on the NBC sitcom The Office at the beginning of its seventh season as a co-executive producer. He wrote one episode, entitled "Christening", which aired on November 4, 2010.

Lodge 49 
Ocko was showrunning and executive producing the AMC comedy-drama, Lodge 49, which premiered on August 6, 2018. On October 4, 2018, the series was renewed for a second season, which premiered on August 12, 2019. More recently, he signed a deal with AMC Studios.

Awards and nominations 
Ocko has been nominated for four Writers Guild of America awards, one of which he won for his work on Not Necessarily the News in 1990.

References

External links 

American television producers
American television writers
American male television writers
Living people
Place of birth missing (living people)
Year of birth missing (living people)